Concetta Capozzi Brown (born May 21, 1951) is an American former tennis player.

Capozzi, raised in an Italian-American family in Middletown, Ohio, was a highly ranked junior and won an Orange Bowl (14s) title in 1964. Attending Odessa Junior College, she was a national collegiate doubles champion in 1970 with Pam Farmer. She twice reached the second round in singles at the US Open.

References

External links
 

1951 births
Living people
American female tennis players
Tennis people from Ohio
Odessa College alumni
Sportspeople from Middletown, Ohio
American people of Italian descent
College women's tennis players in the United States